Daniel Thuayre (12 March 1924 – 12 November 1980) was a French racing cyclist. He rode in the 1947 and 1948 Tour de France.

References

External links
 

1924 births
1980 deaths
French male cyclists
People from Fontenay-aux-Roses
Sportspeople from Hauts-de-Seine
Cyclists from Île-de-France